Nungambakkam is a 2020 Indian Tamil-language drama film directed by Ramesh Selvan. Based on the Swathi murder case, the film stars Ajmal, Mano and Ayra. The film completed its shoot in 2017 but faced production and legal delays before releasing on 30 October 2020 through a digital platform.

Synopsis 
The film's plot is based on the real-life incident of the Swathi murder case, which took place at the Nungambakkam railway station in Chennai during June 2016.

Cast 

Ajmal as Inspector Shankar
Praveenkumar Mano as Rajkumar
Ayra as Sumathi
A. Venkatesh as Advocate Durai
G. Gnanasambandam as a Lawyer
R. N. R. Manohar as Director General of Police
Rajkanth as Police inspector
Munnar Ramesh as Jailer Shanmuga Pandian
Ganesh as Commissioner of Police
S. V. Thangaraj as Sivakumar

Production
Director Ramesh Selvan and writer R. B. Ravi scripted the film Swathi Kolai Vazhaku on the Swathi murder case. Rookie actors Ayra and Mano from Koothu-P-Pattarai have were cast to play Swathi and Ramkumar, respectively, while Ajmal was signed to play the role of the Nungambakkam inspector investigating the murder, and A. Venkatesh reprised the role of Ramraj, Ramkumar's lawyer. After completing shoot in early 2017, a trailer was released by actors Vishal and Arya in May 2017.

The father of Swathi and the brother of Ramkumar expressed their objections to the film, prompting Ramesh to change the script, character names and title to Nungambakkam. The censor board made a series of further cuts, prompting the team to reshoot more scenes. The film was delayed even further after politician Thol. Thirumavalavan raised an objection to the film's release for portraying dalits in a demeaning manner. He opted to drop his case after a special screening.

Release 
Following the production delays, the team prepared to release the film in July and then August 2019. However, the film was postponed and failed to have a theatrical release.

In October 2020, the team released the film on 30 October 2020 through a digital platform, CiniFlix.
After a poor response on the OTT platform, the film re released in theatres on 20 November. The New Indian Express called the film "a tedious watch with lackadaisical storytelling".

References

External links

2020s Tamil-language films
2020 films
2020 direct-to-video films
Indian films based on actual events
2020 drama films
Films set in Chennai
Films shot in Chennai